The Society of Engineers was a British learned society established in 1854. It was the first society to issue the professional title of Incorporated Engineer. It merged with the Institution of Incorporated Engineers (IIE) in 2005, and in 2006 the merged body joined with the Institution of Electrical Engineers to become the Institution of Engineering and Technology.

History

Establishment
Established in May 1854 in The Strand, London, the Society of Engineers was one of the oldest professional engineering bodies in the United Kingdom (after the Smeatonian Society of Civil Engineers, 1771, the Institution of Civil Engineers, 1818, and the Institution of Mechanical Engineers, 1847)

It promoted the interests of members worldwide and was concerned with all branches of engineering. It was founded by Henry Palfrey Stephenson and Robert Monro Christie as a means of reunion for former students of Putney College (the short-lived College for Civil Engineers, 1839–c.1851) — one of few institutions then giving technical and scientific training for engineers — with Stephenson serving as president in 1856 and 1859.

Timeline
 1839 – College for Civil Engineers founded
 1854 – Society of Engineers (SoE) founded 
 1884 – Junior Institution of Engineers founded 
 Date unknown – Junior Institution of Engineers renamed the Institution of Mechanical & General Technician Engineers (IMGTechE) 
 Early 20th century – Association of Supervisory Electrical Engineers (ASEE) founded 
 1928 – Cumann na nInnealtoiri (The Engineers Society) is founded in Ireland 
 Early 20th century – Institute of Engineers and Technicians (IET) founded 
 Mid 20th century – Institution of Incorporated Executive Engineers (IIExE) founded 
 Mid 20th century – The Institution of Electronics and Radio Engineers (IERE) founded 
 1965 – Institution of Electrical and Electronics Technician Engineers (IEETE) founded,       incorporating ASEE (with support from the IEE) 
 1965 – The Society of Electronics and Radio Technicians (SERT) founded by amalgamation of IERE with Radio Trades Examination Board (RTEB).  SERT then supported RTEB renamed as the Electronics Examination Board (EEB)
 1969 – A number of Corporate Members of the Society of Engineers founded on the 27 October 1969 The Society of Professional Engineers (SPE) that maintains a register of Engineers who have proved their competence and can be accurately described as Professional Engineers and who on Registration can use the designation "P.Eng.";
 1969 – The Institution of Civil Engineers and Cumann na nInnealtóirí merged to form the Institution of Engineers of Ireland, now known as Engineers Ireland.
 1978 – The Institution of Technician Engineers in Mechanical Engineering (ITEME)    founded (with support from IMechE) 
 1982 – The IMGTechE and ITEME merged to form the Institution of Mechanical Incorporated Engineers (IMechIE) 
 1982 – IEETE renamed the Institution of Electrical and Electronics Incorporated Engineers
 1990 – IEEIE and SERT merged to form the Institution of Electronics and Electrical Incorporated Engineers (IEEIE) 
 1998 – IEEIE, IMechIE and IET merged to form the Institution of Incorporated Engineers in electronic, electrical and mechanical Engineering (IIE) 
 1999 – IEExE merged with IIE 
 2001 – IIE granted royal charter and renamed the Institution of Incorporated Engineers (IIE) 
 2004 – Institute of British Engineers (IBE) wound up
 2005 – EEB wound up 
 2005 – Society of Engineers merged into IIE. The merger ensured continued recognition of the society as its members retained their post nominal letters (MSE or MSEng), and securedg a broader membership base for the IIE.
 2006 – IIE and IEE (Institution of Electrical Engineers) joined to form the Institution of Engineering and Technology (IET).
 2018 – SPE absorbed into IET
 2019 – The Society of Environmental Engineers (SEE) wound up
The IET now has more than 150,000 members worldwide, and incorporates all members of the Society of Engineers.

Membership

Examinations
To become a member the candidate was subjected to an examination divided into three parts:

 Part I:   General Engineering
 Part II:  Design Paper (Civil, Structural, Mechanical, Electrical/ Electronics Project).
 Part III: Management

Membership qualifications
 ASE: Associate Engineering (Non-Corporate Member)
minimum age 21 years, a qualification BTEC, HND, HNC or GNVQ/NVQ/SNQ Level 4 in engineering or similar approved qualification and 3 years of engineering training. Pass Part I of SoE's Exams.
 AMSE: Associate Member (Non-Corporate Member)
minimum age 23 years, ASE plus CertEng or BEng /  BSc or GNVQ / NVQ / SNVO Level 5 in engineering or similar approved qualification and 5 years of engineering training /experience including 2 years practical or site work. Pass Part II of SoE's Exams.
 MSE: Member (Corporate Member)
minimum age 26 years AMSE plus DipEng or BEng(Hons)or similar approved qualification or MEng with approved project study at a participating university and 5 years engineering training/experience including 2 years practical or site work plus holding a position of professional responsibility for at least 3 years. Pass Part III of SoE's Exams.

Sample of the Membership Certificate: The sensible data of the holder have been deleted for privacy reasons.
http://www.slideshare.net/slideshow/embed_code/38172939
See slides 7-42-43-44
http://www.authorstream.com/Presentation/aSGuest141513-1498327-technicians-engineers-challenges-possibilities/
The Society of Professional Engineers-SPE (UK) is a direct emanation of the Society of Engineers ( 1969 ).
See links at the bottom of the page.

 FSE: Fellow (Corporate Member) - No Direct Entry
minimum age 33 years, Corporate Members of at least 7 years standing, who in the opinion of the Membership Elections Committee endorsed by the directors are deemed to have had sufficient experience (including major responsibility in the design,
research or execution of engineering works) and who can also demonstrate continued career development. Services rendered to the society in particular or to the profession of engineering generally are also taken into account.

 HonFSE: Honorary Fellow (Corporate Member) - No Direct Entry
Honorary Fellows shall be persons of distinguished position or scientific attainments nominated and elected by the directors who shall consent to become members of the society.

Eminent members
The society has had many eminent engineers among its membership and in receipt of its awards which include the Churchill Medal. On 27 November 1946 at the House of Commons, Sir Winston Churchill became an Honorary Fellow and approved the use of his name for the society's senior award. Another Honorary Fellow was radio pioneer Sir Guglielmo Marconi.

Churchill Medal recipients have included Sir Frank Whittle for jet engine design, Sir Christopher Hinton and Sir John Cockcroft for their work on atomic energy, Sir Geoffrey de Havilland for aircraft design, Sir Bernard Lovell for radio astronomy and Alan Wells for the Wells wave turbine.

Past presidents

2004 Allan Cooper Wright 
2003 S John C Gale 
2002 David McLaren 
2001 David W Purnell 
1999 Brian Rhys Masterston 
1998 Alan D Crowhurst 
1997 Alan D Crowhurst 
1996 John H Wilkinson 
1995 Dennis F B Gibbard 
1994 Eric S Long 
1993 David McLaren 
1992 Thomas Kenneth-Duncan 
1991 T E Geldart 
1990 J H Roderick Haswell 
1989 Iain Cooper Wright 
1988 Iain Cooper Wright 
1987 Alan John Curzon 
1986 Raymond Charles Yarnell 
1985 David Vaughan Richards 
1984 Victor Charles Ealey 
1983 Charles Kenneth Haswell 
1982 Colin Cruickshanks Bates 
1981 John Alfred Gardner 
1980 David John Hardcastle 
1979 Richard Charles Wykes 
1978 Albert Edward Witchlow 
1977 Peter Michael Rex Olley 
1976 Thomas Morgan Scanlon 
1975 John David Burrows 
1974 The Earl of Ilchester 
1973 Douglas John Ayres 
1972 Stanley Nash Bruce Gairn 
1971 Brian Joseph Bell 
1970 Frank Wilsenham Hyde 
1969 William Godfrey Taylor 
1968 Leo Giulio Culleton 
1967 Robert Carey 
1966 Gilbert Robert Charles Bunn 
1965 Charles Leslie Nichol Laing 
1964 Donald William Tull 
1963 Donald William Tull 
1962 John Charles Maxwell-Cook 
1961 William Edward Humphrey 
1960 Eric Godfrey Massey Collier 
1959 Iain Cyril Cocking 
1958 Robert Clark 
1957 Edward Charles Lejeune 
1956 Captain Harry Francis Jackson 
1955 Henry George Taylor 
1954 Walter Robert Howard 

1953 Gerald Norman Swayne 
1952 Ronald Samuel Vernon Barber 
1951 Paul Sison Ham 
1950 Cyril Lett Boucher 
1949 Edward Sugden Waddington 
1948 Ernest Edward Turner 
1947 Victor Stephen Wigmore 
1946 Albert Edward Turner 
1945 Frank Parfett 
1944 Frank Parfett 
1943 Edward John Spiller Lamport 
1942 Sir Henry Percy Maybury 
1941 Sir Henry Percy Maybury 
1940 Sir Henry Percy Maybury 
1939 Sir Henry Percy Maybury 
1938 H Bentham 
1937 Bateman Brown Tarring OBE 
1935 Hervey Carlton Hawkins 
1934 Arthur Marinus Alexander Struben OBE 
1933 James Douglas Haworth 
1932 Frederick William Mackenzie-Skues 
1931 Harry William Towse 
1930 William Marrow Beckett MBE 
1929 Archibald Kirkwood Dobbs 
1928 Charles Henry James Clayton 
1927 Douglas Charles Fidler 
1926 Gerald Otley Case 
1925 Archibald Stewart Buckle 
1924 George Arthur Becks 
1923 Arthur Marshall Arter 
1922 Alfred Tony Jules Gueritte 
1921 Lord Headley 
1920 Burnard Geen 
1919 Walter Noble Twelvetrees 
1918 William Beedie Esson 
1917 Henry Charles Adams 
1916 Percy Griffith 
1915 Norman Scorgie 
1914 Henry Chawner Hine Shelton 
1913 Arthur Valon 
1912 John Kennedy
1911 Francis George Bloyd 
1910 Diogo A Symons 
1909 Edward John Silcock 
1908 Joseph William Wilson 
1907 Richard St George Moore 
1906 Maurice Wilson 
1905 Nicholas James West 
1904 David Butler Butler 
1902 Percy Griffith 

1901 Charles Mason 
1900 Henry O’Connor 
1899 John Cory Fell 
1898 William Worby Beaumont 
1897 George Maxwell Lawford 
1896 Samuel Herbert Cox 
1895 William George Peirce 
1894 George Abraham Goodwin 
1893 William Andrew McIntosh Valon 
1892 Joseph William Wilson Junior 
1891 William Newby Colam 
1890 Henry Adams 
1889 Jonathan R Baillie 
1888 Arthur T Walmisley 
1887 Professor Henry Robinson 
1886 Perry Fairfax Nursey 
1885 Charles Gandon 
1884 Arthur Rigg 
1883 Jabez Church 
1882 Jabez Church 
1881 Charles Horsley 
1880 Joseph Bernays 
1879 Robert Paulson Spice 
1878 Robert Paulson Spice 
1877 Thomas Cargill 
1876 Vaughan Pendred 
1875 John Henry Adams 
1874 William MacGeorge 
1873 Jabez Church 
1872 Jabez Church 
1871 Baldwin Latham 
1870 William Adams 
1869 Frederick William Bryant 
1868 Baldwin Latham
1867 William Henry Le Feuvre
1866 Zerah Colburn 
1865 William Thomas Carrington 
1864 Charles Llewellyn Light 
1863 Robert Monro Christie 
1862 Edward Riley 
1861 James C Amos 
1860 Rowland Mason Ordish 
1859 Henry Palfrey Stephenson 
1858 Robert Monro Christie 
1857 George William Allan
1856 Henry Palfrey Stephenson 
1855 No official president 
1854 No official president

See also
Glossary of engineering
Engineering ethics

References

British Qualifications
34th Edition
A Complete Guide to Educational, Technical
Professional and Academic Qualifications in Britain .
https://books.google.it/books?id=-CA2-PM2OKYC&pg=PA591&lpg=PA591&dq=British+Qualifications+,the+society+of+engineers+one&source=bl&ots=t8A2gi1qUv&sig=8aIcmYMfZyguO1Qo3AMtcm8rtYQ&hl=en&sa=X&ved=0ahUKEwil0J3ZsO3KAhVFCiwKHfHmCIsQ6AEINTAC#v=onepage&q=British%20Qualifications%20%2Cthe%20society%20of%20engineers%20one&f=true

External links 
The IET, The Institution of Engineering and Technology
SPE - the Society of Professional Engineers
ABEI, the Association of British Engineers in Italy

Engineering societies based in the United Kingdom
Engineers
1854 establishments in the United Kingdom
Organizations established in 1854